William Meehan Lonsdale (born 16 September 1986) is a New Zealand cricketer.  He is a left arm medium fast bowler and a right hand middle order batsman. He made his first class debut against the Wellington Firebirds in 2007.

References

1986 births
Living people
New Zealand cricketers
Canterbury cricketers
Place of birth missing (living people)